Stenger test is a test of hearing, primarily used to confirm non-organic hearing loss. It is also used to detect subjects who falsely claim to have hearing loss in one ear.

Principle
The test is based on Stenger principle. The principle states that, if a tone of two intensities (one greater than the other) is delivered to two ears of a person simultaneously, the ear which receives the tone of the higher intensity alone hears it.

Method
The test can be done using tuning forks in the clinical setting. The individual is blindfolded before the test starts. Two tuning forks of the same frequency are stricken and kept at a distance of 25 cm from each ear. When asked, the individual will claim to hear it in the normal ear. Then, the tuning fork is brought as close as 8 cm near the feigned ear while maintaining the tuning fork at the normal side at the same distance. The individual will deny hearing anything if he/she is a malingerer. An individual with true deafness should continue to hear the sound on the normal side. Alternatively, this test can be performed more accurately using two-channel audiometer using pure tone signals.: In this procedure, a tone is presented to the "good ear" at 10 dB SL (above the threshold level). This should elicit a response from the patient. Next, using the second channel, present the same tone to both ears simultaneously starting at 0 dB HL for the "bad ear". If the patient responds then increase the presentation level in the "bad ear" by 5 dB, maintaining the same presentation level in the "good ear" (10 dB SL) until the patient stops responding. Because the tone is still  above the threshold in the better ear, a lack of response will mean that the tone has been heard loud enough in the "bad ear" that the patient can no longer detect the audible sound in the "good ear". This is called the Stenger Effect.

Interpretation 
the lowest HL of the tone in the poorer ear producing this effect is MCIL and should not be more than 20db above true threshold.

             Perk and rose found that MCIL to be within 14db of the true threshold resulting in general conclusion that the Stenger test can identify the general hearing threshold of poorer ear in unilateral pseudohypoacusis cases .

References

Audiology
Forensic techniques